Holaxonia is a suborder of soft corals, a member of the phylum Cnidaria. Members of this suborder are sometimes known as gorgonians and include the sea blades, the sea fans, the sea rods and the sea whips. These soft corals are colonial, sessile organisms and are generally tree-like in structure. They do not have a hard skeleton composed of calcium carbonate but have a firm but pliable, central axial skeleton composed of a fibrous protein called gorgonin embedded in a tissue matrix, the coenenchyme. In some genera this is permeated with a calcareous substance in the form of fused spicules. Members of this suborder are characterized by having an unspiculated axis and often a soft, chambered central core. The polyps have eight-fold symmetry and in many species, especially in the families Gorgoniidae and Plexauridae, contain symbiotic photosynthetic algae called zooxanthellae. These soft corals are popular in salt water aquaria.

Families and genera
The World Register of Marine Species list the following families and genera:

Family Acanthogorgiidae Gray, 1859
Genus Acanthogorgia Gray, 1857
Genus Anthogorgia Verrill, 1868
Genus Calcigorgia Broch, 1935
Genus Calicogorgia Thomson & Henderson, 1906
Genus Callicigorgia
Genus Cyclomuricea Nutting, 1908
Genus Muricella Verrill, 1868
Genus Versluysia Nutting, 1910
Family Dendrobrachiidae Brook, 1889
Genus Dendrobrachia Brook, 1889
Family Gorgoniidae Lamouroux, 1812
Genus Adelogorgia Bayer, 1958
Genus Antillogorgia Bayer, 1951
Genus Eugorgia Verrill, 1868
Genus Eunicella Verrill, 1869
Genus Filigorgia Stiasny, 1937
Genus Gorgonia Linnaeus, 1758
Genus Guaiagorgia Grasshoff & Alderslade, 1997
Genus Hicksonella Nutting, 1910
Genus Leptogorgia Milne-Edwards, 1857
Genus Olindagorgia Bayer, 1981
Genus Pacifigorgia Bayer, 1951
Genus Phycogorgia Milne Edwards & Haime, 1850
Genus Phyllogorgia Milne Edwards & Haime, 1850
Genus Pinnigorgia Grasshoff & Alderslade, 1997
Genus Pseudopterogorgia Kükenthal, 1919
Genus Pterogorgia Ehrenberg, 1834
Genus Rumphella Bayer, 1955
Genus Tobagogorgia Sanchez, 2007
Family Keroeididae Kinoshita, 1910
Genus Ideogorgia Bayer, 1981
Genus Keroeides Studer, 1887
Genus Lignella Gray, 1870
Genus Pseudothelogorgia (van Ofwegen, 1990)
Genus Thelogorgia Bayer, 1991
Family Plexauridae Gray, 1859
Genus Acanthacis Deichmann, 1936
Genus Acanthomuricea Hentschel, 1903
Genus Acis Duchassaing & Michelotti, 1860
Genus Alaskagorgia Sánchez & Cairns, 2004
Genus Anthomuricea Studer, 1887
Genus Anthoplexaura Kükenthal, 1908
Genus Astrogorgia Verrill, 1868
Genus Astromuricea Germanos, 1895
Genus Bayergorgia Williams & Lopez-Gonzalez, 2005
Genus Bebryce Philippi, 1841
Genus Chromoplexaura Williams, 2013
Genus Cryogorgia Williams, 2005
Genus Dentomuricea Grasshoff, 1977
Genus Discogorgia Kükenthal, 1919
Genus Echinogorgia Kölliker, 1865
Genus Echinomuricea Verrill, 1869
Genus Elasmogorgia Wright & Studer, 1889
Genus Eunicea Lamouroux, 1816
Genus Euplexaura Verrill, 1869
Genus Heterogorgia Verrill, 1868
Genus Hypnogorgia Duchassaing & Michelotti, 1864
Genus Lapidogorgia Grasshoff, 1999
Genus Lepidomuricea Kükenthal, 1919
Genus Lytreia Bayer, 1981
Genus Menacella Gray, 1870
Genus Menella Gray, 1870
Genus Mesogligorgia Lopez-Gonzalez, 2007
Genus Muricea Lamouroux, 1821
Genus Muriceides Wright & Studer, 1889
Genus Muriceopsis Aurivillius, 1931
Genus Paracis Kükenthal, 1919
Genus Paramuricea Koelliker, 1865
Genus Paraplexaura Kükenthal, 1909
Genus Placogorgia Wright & Studer, 1889
Genus Plexaura Lamouroux, 1821
Genus Plexaurella Kölliker, 1865
Genus Plexauroides Wright & Studer
Genus Plexauropsis Verrill
Genus Psammogorgia Verrill, 1868
Genus Pseudoplexaura Wright & Studer, 1889
Genus Pseudothesea Kükenthal, 1919
Genus Scleracis Kükenthal, 1919
Genus Spinimuricea Grasshoff, 1992
Genus Swiftia Duchassaing & Michelotti, 1864
Genus Thesea Duchassaing & Michelotti, 1860
Genus Trimuricea Gordon, 1926
Genus Villogorgia Duchassaing & Michelloti, 1862

See also
Leptogorgia virgulata

References

Alcyonacea
 
Cnidarian suborders